Buena Vista Township is a township located in Atlantic County, New Jersey, United States. As of the 2020 United States Census, the township's population was 7,033, a decrease of 537 (−7.1%) from the 2010 census count of 7,570, which in turn reflected an increase of 134 (+1.8%) from the 7,436 counted in the 2000 census.

Buena Vista was incorporated as a township by an act of the New Jersey Legislature on March 5, 1867, from portions of Hamilton Township. Portions of the township were taken on May 23, 1906, to create Folsom, and on September 1, 1948, to create Buena Borough. The name comes from the 1847 Battle of Buena Vista of the Mexican–American War.

On April 26, 2004, the Buena Vista Township Committee voted to temporarily rename the community of Richland, a section of Buena Vista Township. For the first half of the month of May, Richland became Mojito, New Jersey, named after the Cuban rum drink. Bacardi had offered to give the township $5,000 for recreation projects in exchange for a sign placed on U.S. Route 40 commemorating the new name. Richland was chosen because it is home to the family-run Dalponte Farms, a major east coast supplier of mint, an essential ingredient of the mojito.

Geography 
According to the United States Census Bureau, the township had a total area of 41.58 square miles (107.69 km2), including 41.08 square miles (106.39 km2) of land and 0.50 square miles (1.30 km2) of water (1.20%).

Collings Lakes (with a 2010 population of 1,706) is an unincorporated community and census-designated place (CDP) located within Buena Vista Township.

Other unincorporated communities, localities and place names located partially or completely within the township include Buena Acres, East Vineland, Lake Ann, Milmay, New Kuban, Newtonville, Pine Lake Estates and Richland.

The township borders Buena, Folsom, Hamilton Township and Weymouth Township in Atlantic County; Maurice River Township and Vineland in Cumberland County; and both Franklin Township and Monroe Township in Gloucester County.

The township is one of 56 South Jersey municipalities that are included within the New Jersey Pinelands National Reserve, a protected natural area of unique ecology covering , that has been classified as a United States Biosphere Reserve and established by Congress in 1978 as the nation's first National Reserve. Part of the township is included in the state-designated Pinelands Area, which includes portions of Atlantic County, along with areas in Burlington, Camden, Cape May, Cumberland, Gloucester and Ocean counties. 90% of the township's area is within the boundaries of the Pine Barrens.

Demographics

2010 census

2000 census
As of the 2000 United States census there were 7,436 people living in the township, organized into 2,648 households and 1,972 families. The racial makeup of the township was 77.34% White, 15.69% African American, 0.23% Native American, 0.22% Asian, 0.01% Pacific Islander, 4.07% from other races, and 2.43% from two or more races. 9.27% of the population were Hispanic or Latino of any race.

There were 2,648 households, out of which 30.6% had children under the age of 18 living with them, 58.5% were married couples living together, 10.6% had a female householder with no husband present, and 25.5% were non-families. 21.0% of all households were made up of individuals, and 10.6% had someone living alone who was 65 years of age or older. The average household size was 2.77 and the average family size was 3.20.

In the township the population was spread out, with 24.7% under the age of 18, 7.4% from 18 to 24, 27.5% from 25 to 44, 25.0% from 45 to 64, and 15.3% who were 65 years of age or older. The median age was 39 years. For every 100 females, there were 95.0 males. For every 100 females age 18 and over, there were 92.6 males.

The median income for a household in the township was $43,770, and the median income for a family was $50,403. Males had a median income of $36,064 versus $26,180 for females. The per capita income for the township was $18,382. 12.1% of the population and 7.8% of families were below the poverty line. Out of the total population, 13.2% of those under the age of 18 and 13.3% of those 65 and older were living below the poverty line.

Government

Local government 
Buena Vista is governed under the Township form of New Jersey municipal government, one of 141 municipalities (of the 564) statewide that use this form, the second-most commonly used form of government in the state. The Township Committee is comprised of five members, who are elected directly by the voters at-large in partisan elections to serve three-year terms of office on a staggered basis, with either one or two seats coming up for election each year as part of the November general election in a three-year cycle. At an annual reorganization meeting, the Township Committee selects one of its members to serve as Mayor and another to serve as Deputy Mayor.

, the members of the Buena Vista Township Committee are Mayor William Ruggieri (R, term on committee ends December 31, 2023; term as mayor ends 2022), Deputy Mayor Ellen Testa (R, term on committee ends 2024; term as deputy mayor ends 2024), Aaron Krenzer (R, 2024), Steve Martinelli (D, 2022) and John Williams (D, 2022).

In December 2019, the Township Committee selected Ronnise White to fill the seat expiring in December 2021 that became vacant following the death of Chuck Chiarello earlier that month; Chiarello had served on the Township Committee for 28 years and as mayor for the previous 23 years.

Federal, state and county representation 
Buena Vista Township is located in the 2nd Congressional District and is part of New Jersey's 2nd state legislative district. Prior to the 2011 reapportionment following the 2010 Census, Buena Vista Township had been in the 1st state legislative district.

 

Atlantic County is governed by a directly elected county executive and a nine-member Board of County Commissioners, responsible for legislation. The executive serves a four-year term and the commissioners are elected to staggered three-year terms, of which four are elected from the county on an at-large basis and five of the commissioners represent equally populated districts. , Atlantic County's Executive is Republican Dennis Levinson, whose term of office ends December 31, 2023. Members of the Board of County Commissioners are:

Ernest D. Coursey, District 1, including Atlantic City (part), Egg Harbor Township (part), and Pleasantville (D, 2022, Atlantic City), Chair Maureen Kern, District 2, including Atlantic City (part), Egg Harbor Township (part), Linwood, Longport, Margate City, Northfield, Somers Point and Ventnor City (R, 2024, Somers Point), Andrew Parker III, District 3, including Egg Harbor Township (part) and Hamilton Township (part) (R, Egg Harbor Township, 2023), Richard R. Dase, District 4, including Absecon, Brigantine, Galloway Township and Port Republic (R, 2022, Galloway Township), James A. Bertino, District 5, including Buena, Buena Vista Township, Corbin City, Egg Harbor City, Estell Manor, Folsom, Hamilton Township (part), Hammonton, Mullica Township and Weymouth Township (R, 2018, Hammonton), Caren L. Fitzpatrick, At-Large (D, 2023, Linwood), Frank X. Balles, At-Large (R, Pleasantville, 2024) Amy L. Gatto, Freeholder (R, 2022, Hamilton Township) and Vice Chair John W. Risley, At-Large (R, 2023, Egg Harbor Township) 

Atlantic County's constitutional officers are: 
County Clerk Joesph J. Giralo (R, 2026, Hammonton),  
Sheriff Eric Scheffler (D, 2024, Northfield) and 
Surrogate James Curcio (R, 2025, Hammonton).

Politics
As of March 23, 2011, there were a total of 4,833 registered voters in Buena Vista Township, of which 1,406 (29.1% vs. 30.5% countywide) were registered as Democrats, 1,105 (22.9% vs. 25.2%) were registered as Republicans and 2,320 (48.0% vs. 44.3%) were registered as Unaffiliated. There were 2 voters registered as either Libertarians or Greens. Among the township's 2010 Census population, 63.8% (vs. 58.8% in Atlantic County) were registered to vote, including 82.8% of those ages 18 and over (vs. 76.6% countywide).

In the 2012 presidential election, Democrat Barack Obama received 1,920 votes (55.3% vs. 57.9% countywide), ahead of Republican Mitt Romney with 1,483 votes (42.7% vs. 41.1%) and other candidates with 36 votes (1.0% vs. 0.9%), among the 3,471 ballots cast by the township's 5,068 registered voters, for a turnout of 68.5% (vs. 65.8% in Atlantic County). In the 2008 presidential election, Democrat Barack Obama received 1,910 votes (54.8% vs. 56.5% countywide), ahead of Republican John McCain with 1,504 votes (43.1% vs. 41.6%) and other candidates with 50 votes (1.4% vs. 1.1%), among the 3,486 ballots cast by the township's 5,131 registered voters, for a turnout of 67.9% (vs. 68.1% in Atlantic County). In the 2004 presidential election, Democrat John Kerry received 1,747 votes (52.4% vs. 52.0% countywide), ahead of Republican George W. Bush with 1,504 votes (45.1% vs. 46.2%) and other candidates with 36 votes (1.1% vs. 0.8%), among the 3,333 ballots cast by the township's 4,791 registered voters, for a turnout of 69.6% (vs. 69.8% in the whole county).

In the 2013 gubernatorial election, Republican Chris Christie received 1,347 votes (57.2% vs. 60.0% countywide), ahead of Democrat Barbara Buono with 889 votes (37.7% vs. 34.9%) and other candidates with 39 votes (1.7% vs. 1.3%), among the 2,356 ballots cast by the township's 5,158 registered voters, yielding a 45.7% turnout (vs. 41.5% in the county). In the 2009 gubernatorial election, Republican Chris Christie received 1,191 votes (46.4% vs. 47.7% countywide), ahead of Democrat Jon Corzine with 1,149 votes (44.7% vs. 44.5%), Independent Chris Daggett with 132 votes (5.1% vs. 4.8%) and other candidates with 37 votes (1.4% vs. 1.2%), among the 2,568 ballots cast by the township's 4,916 registered voters, yielding a 52.2% turnout (vs. 44.9% in the county).

Education 
Students in public school for pre-kindergarten through twelfth grade from Buena Vista Township attend the Buena Regional School District, together with students from Buena Borough. Students are sent to the district's high school for grades 9–12 from both Estell Manor City and Weymouth Township as part of sending/receiving relationships with the respective school districts.

As of the 2020–21 school year, the district, comprised of five schools, had an enrollment of 1,691 students and 150.0 classroom teachers (on an FTE basis), for a student–teacher ratio of 11.3:1. Schools in the district (with 2020–21 enrollment data from the National Center for Education Statistics) are 
Collings Lakes Elementary School with 197 students in grades K-2, 
John C. Milanesi Elementary School with 259 students in grades PreK-2, 
Dr. J.P. Cleary Elementary School with 309 students in grades 3-5, 
Buena Regional Middle School with 336 students in grades 6-8 and 
Buena Regional High School with 535 students in grades 9-12.

Borough public school students are also eligible to attend the Atlantic County Institute of Technology in the Mays Landing section of Hamilton Township or the Charter-Tech High School for the Performing Arts, located in Somers Point.

Founded in 1959, St. Augustine Preparatory School is an all-male Catholic high school, operated under the jurisdiction of the Roman Catholic Diocese of Camden.

Transportation

Roads and highways

The main highways serving Buena Vista Township include U.S. Route 40, which runs from Buena southeastward across the township to Hamilton Township. New Jersey Route 54 also crosses the township, starting at U.S. Route 40 at the Buena border and continuing northeastward across the township to Folsom.

The closest limited access roads are Route 55 in neighboring Franklin and Vineland, as well as the Atlantic City Expressway in Hamilton Township.

Public transportation
NJ Transit provides service between the Atlantic City Bus Terminal in Atlantic City and Upper Deerfield Township on the 553 route.

Notable people
People who were born in, residents of, or otherwise closely associated with Buena Vista Township include:

 John Armato (born 1948), politician who has represented the 2nd Legislative District in the New Jersey Assembly since 2018, after serving three years on the Buena Vista Township Committee
 Liv Lux Miyake-Mugler, drag performer most known for competing on season 13 of RuPaul's Drag Race
 Tony Siscone (born 1950), race car driver

References

External links 

 Buena Vista Township's website
 Buena Regional School District
 
 School Data for the Buena Regional School District, National Center for Education Statistics
 Cape May Seashore Lines Railroad

 
1867 establishments in New Jersey
Populated places in the Pine Barrens (New Jersey)
Populated places established in 1867
Township form of New Jersey government
Townships in Atlantic County, New Jersey